Cory Bennett (born 12 July 1991) is a field hockey player from New Zealand.

Personal life
Cory Bennett was born and raised in North Shore, New Zealand. He currently works as an insurance broker in Auckland.

Career

Club hockey
In the New Zealand National Hockey League, Bennett plays hockey for North Harbour.

National team
Cory Bennett made his debut for the Black Sticks in 2013, at the Sultan Azalan Shah Cup, in Ipoh, Malaysia.

Since his debut, Bennett has been a regular inclusion in the Black Sticks side. During his career he has medalled three times, winning silver at the 2018 Commonwealth Games and the 2013 and 2017 Oceania Cups.

His most recent appearance for the national team was during the inaugural tournament of the FIH Pro League, where New Zealand finished in last place.

On 5 August 2019, Bennett was named in the Black Sticks squad for the Ready Steady Tokyo Olympic test event in Tokyo, Japan. In December 2020 he announced his retirement from the national team.

References

External links
 
 
 

1991 births
Living people
New Zealand male field hockey players
Male field hockey defenders
2018 Men's Hockey World Cup players
Commonwealth Games silver medallists for New Zealand
Commonwealth Games medallists in field hockey
Field hockey players at the 2018 Commonwealth Games
Medallists at the 2018 Commonwealth Games